The following is a list of notable events and releases of the year 1933 in Norwegian music.

Events

 July
 1 – The Norwegian Broadcasting Corporation (NRK) was founded.

Deaths

 June
 21 – Alf Fasmer Dahl, priest and composer (born 1874).

 July
 29 – Gerhard Schjelderup, composer, known especially for his operas (born 1859).

Births

 February
 20 – Jan Henrik Kayser, classical pianist (died 2016).

 May
 22 – Eivind Solberg, Norwegian trumpeter (died 2008).
 25 – Almar Heggen, opera singer (died 2014).

 August
 19 – Asmund Bjørken, jazz and traditional folk accordionist and saxophonist (died 2018).

See also
 1933 in Norway
 Music of Norway

References

 
Norwegian music
Norwegian
Music
1930s in Norwegian music